Watampone is a town in South Sulawesi and the capital of Bone Regency. Known colloquially as Bone, it has a land area of 126.35 km2 and had a population of 149,336 at the 2020 Census. It is divided administratively into three districts (kecamatan) within the Bone Regency. It is also the birthplace of the 10th and 12th Vice President of the Republic of Indonesia Jusuf Kalla.

Climate
Watampone has a tropical rainforest climate (Af) with moderate rainfall from September to November and heavy to very heavy rainfall in the remaining months.

References

Populated places in South Sulawesi
Regency seats of South Sulawesi